Evan Edward "Red" Vogds (February 10, 1923 – August 6, 1994) was a professional American football guard in the All-America Football Conference (AAFC) and the National Football League (NFL).

Born in Johnsburg, Wisconsin, Vogds played college football at the University of Wisconsin–Madison. He played for the AAFC's Chicago Rockets (1946–1947) and the NFL's Green Bay Packers (1948–1949).

See also
Green Bay Packers players

References

1923 births
1994 deaths
People from Calumet, Wisconsin
Players of American football from Wisconsin
American football offensive guards
Wisconsin Badgers football players
Chicago Rockets players
Green Bay Packers players